They Only Come Out at Night may refer to:

They Only Come Out at Night, the fourth studio album by The Edgar Winter Group
They Only Come Out at Night (TV series), a 1975 TV series directed by Daryl Duke
They Only Come Out at Night (Lordi song)
They Only Come Out at Night (Peter Brown song)
We Only Come Out at Night, a song by Smashing Pumpkins on the album Mellon Collie and the Infinite Sadness

See also
Creature of the night (disambiguation)